Porsche Design is a German product design studio and brand founded in 1972 by F. A. Porsche, the designer of the original Porsche 911, known for its high-end accessories including sunglasses, pens, and watches. The current legal instantiation of the company, Porsche Lizenz- und Handelsgesellschaft mbH & Co. KG, based in Ludwigsburg, Germany, was formed in November 2003 as a majority-owned subsidiary of Porsche AG to combine Porsche AG's and Porsche Design Group's accessories and licensing business into one single company. The company's activities are focused on the Porsche Design Studio (since 2015 Studio F. A. Porsche) in Zell am See, Austria, which also works for other companies in the field of industrial and product design, and the "Porsche Design" and "Porsche Driver's Selection" brands.

History

The Porsche Design Studio (now Studio F. A. Porsche) was established in Stuttgart, Germany, in 1972 by Prof. Ferdinand Alexander Porsche, (nickname Butzi), Grandson of the Porsche founder Ferdinand Porsche and designer of the Porsche 911. The Porsche 911 (originally 901) is just one example of the many objects Prof. Ferdinand Alexander Porsche designed throughout his career, supposedly off the simple principle that "If you analyze the function of an object its form often becomes obvious."
 
The Design Studio was relocated to Zell am See, Austria, in 1974. Porsche has been producing car-related accessories since the 1950s, with luggage series, purses, T-shirts, calendars, model cars and buttons being offered in the "Porsche Boutique". In the decades that followed, numerous classic accessories such as watches, sunglasses, and writing utensils were created and marketed worldwide. At the same time a large number of industrial products, household appliances, and consumer goods – even streetcars for the city of Vienna – were designed under the "Design by F.A. Porsche" brand. In 1994 the merchandising division of Porsche AG finally acquired the name "Porsche Selection", which was changed to "Porsche Driver's Selection" in 2004.

Following a corporate reorganisation in 2007, Porsche Design Group is now owned by Porsche SE. Originally, there were five independently operated companies with two different brands: "Porsche Design/Design by F.A. Porsche" and "Porsche Selection".

In the year 2012 Porsche Design opened several concept stores all around the world.

"Porsche Design Timepieces AG", based in the Swiss Canton "Jura", is responsible for developing and producing Porsche Design timepieces; marketing and sales is overseen by the Porsche Design Group based in Ludwigsburg, Germany. The first watch series offered solely by Porsche Design went on sale in the fourth quarter of 2014, although the first Porsche-designed watch, the "Chronograph 1", was released in 1972.

In 2015, the Design Studio changed its name to Studio F. A. Porsche in memory of its founder Ferdinand Alexander Porsche.

Products
Since 2005 all products have been developed and marketed under the brand name Porsche Design. The products are divided into 9 different categories:

P'1000 Fashion

P'2000 Luggage

P'3000 Accessories 

High-end pens and mechanical pencils made from stainless steel.

P'5000 Sport 
P'500 is the luxury sportswear series. In 2014, Adidas partnered with Porsche Design to launch the Porsche Design Sport by adidas.

P'6000 Timepieces 
The P'6510 was the world's first black chronograph released 1972. In July 2015 Porsche Design launched its new timepieces collection, the Chronotimer Series 1.

P'7000 Home 

Kitchen knives for Chroma Cnife.

P'8000 Eyewear 
In 1978 Porsche Design presented the spectacles P'8478, one of the most worn sunglasses in the world.
The P'8479 was worn by Yoko Ono on various record covers and magazine covers. Continuous innovations and new materials has produced, for example, the elegant P'8254, totally made in titanium, weighing just 120g (without lenses).

P'9000 Electronics

LaCie Porsche Design Series 
In 2016, LaCie, a subsidiary of Seagate Technology announced their partnership on creating luxurious-style computer hard drives with USB-C connectors.

BlackBerry Porsche Design Series 

In 2011 Porsche Design partnered with BlackBerry to create the BlackBerry Porsche Design P'9981 smart phone featuring a stainless steel and leather design. In 2013 Porsche Design began selling the P'9982 in stainless steel and either crocodile or Italian leather. The device has increased the internal memory of its sister model, the Z10 with a large touch-screen and 64GB memory on board. Together with a 64GB microSD slot the phone can have a total storage of 128GB. In the Fall of 2014 Porsche Design developed the Porsche Design P'9983 phone based on the BlackBerry Q10 with 64GB of on board internal memory.

Book One 
In February 2017 Porsche Design revealed the Book One, a premium 2-in-1 Windows laptop. The laptop is the result of a collaboration between Microsoft, Intel, and Quanta Computer. Unique features of the Book One include a hinge designed to mimic a gearbox, and a detachable screen, very similar to Microsoft's own Surface Book. Porsche Design claims the device is the first and only laptop to be both detachable and convertible.

Huawei Mate Porsche Design Series 
The Porsche Design Huawei Mate Series was a collaboration project of Porsche Design and Huawei since 2016. The Porsche Design Huawei Mate 9, Mate 10, Mate RS, Mate 20 RS and Watch 2 was released, featuring Porsche Design logo on the front and the back of the device.

Other 
The Porsche Design Studio also worked within the transport industry to design projects such as the MX3000 three-car electric multiple units built exclusively for the Oslo Metro by Siemens in Vienna, Austria, being used as modified versions in Vienna (U-Bahn) and Singapore (Airport Metro).

Porsche Design is also active in the real estate business designing luxury residences such as the "Porsche Design Tower Miami" featuring three innovative car elevators lifting residents in their cars into so called "Sky Garages" as part of the apartment. Besides Miami, there will be the first Porsche Design Tower in Europe: the "Porsche Design Tower Frankfurt" being finalized in 2018 alongside many other projects in the future to come.

References

External links
 
 

Porsche
Luxury brands
Industrial design firms